The following is a list of the world's largest fixed service satellite operators in the world.  Comparison data is from different time periods and sources and may not be directly comparable.

Note: Revenue in U.S. Dollars

References

 Link to 2005 numbers as pdf
 Link to 2007 numbers as pdf
 Link to 2008 numbers as pdf

External links

 2001 numbers 
 2002 numbers 
 2003 numbers  together with other space firms (total 50) firms reviewed 
 2004 numbers  reviewed in this page from Space News

Largest fixed satellite operators
Space lists
Communication satellite operators